The A. T. House is a historic house located at 435 Main Street, Oak Hill in Greene County, New York.

Description and history 
It was built in three phases: about 1790, about 1795 through 1815, and about 1830. It is a -story and is one of the oldest structures at Oak Hill. Traditional Dutch construction methods were used in the building.

It was listed on the National Register of Historic Places on January 18, 2006.

See also
National Register of Historic Places listings in Greene County, New York

References

Houses on the National Register of Historic Places in New York (state)
Federal architecture in New York (state)
Houses completed in 1790
Houses in Greene County, New York
National Register of Historic Places in Greene County, New York